Lincolnia is a genus of bugs in the tribe Mirini.

See also
 Linconia

References

External links 
 

Miridae genera
Mirini